Recount is a 2008 political drama television film about Florida's vote recount during the 2000 United States presidential election. Written by Danny Strong and directed by Jay Roach, the television film stars Kevin Spacey, Bob Balaban, Ed Begley Jr., Laura Dern, John Hurt, Denis Leary, Bruce McGill, and Tom Wilkinson. It premiered on HBO on May 25, 2008. The television film was nominated for eleven Primetime Emmy Awards, winning three for Outstanding Made for Television Movie, Outstanding Directing for a Miniseries, Movie or Dramatic Special (for Roach), and Outstanding Single-Camera Picture Editing for a Miniseries or a Movie (for Baumgarten). It was also nominated for five Golden Globe Awards and winning Best Supporting Actress – Series, Miniseries or Television Film (for Dern).

Plot
Recount chronicles the 2000 U.S. presidential election Bush v. Gore case between Governor of Texas George W. Bush and U.S. Vice President Al Gore. It begins with the election on November 7 and ends with the Supreme Court ruling, which stopped the Florida election recount on December 12.

Key points depicted include: Gore's retraction of his personal telephone concession to Bush in the early hours of November 8; the decision by the Gore campaign to sue for hand recounts in Democratic strongholds where voting irregularities were alleged, especially in light of the statistical dead heat revealed by the reported machine recount; Republican pressure on Florida's Secretary of State Katherine Harris in light of her legally mandated responsibilities; the attention focused on the hand recounts by media, parties, and the public; the two major announcements by Florida Supreme Court spokesman Craig Waters extending the deadline for returns in the initial recount (November 21, 2000) and ordering a statewide recount of votes (December 8, 2000), and later overturned by the U.S. Supreme Court; and finally the adversarial postures of the Supreme Courts of Florida and the United States, as well as the dissenting opinions among the higher court's justices.

Cast

 Kevin Spacey as Ron Klain
 John Hurt as Warren Christopher
 Laura Dern as Katherine Harris
 Tom Wilkinson as James Baker
 Denis Leary as Michael Whouley
 Ed Begley, Jr. as David Boies
 Bob Balaban as Ben Ginsberg
 Bruce McGill as Mac Stipanovich
 Paul Jeans as Ted Olson
 Bruce Altman as Mitchell Berger
 Alex Staggs as Craig Waters
 Doug Williford as Mark Fabiani
 Gary Basaraba as Clay Roberts
 Stefen Laurantz as Joe Allbaugh
 Mitch Pileggi as Bill Daley
 Jayne Atkinson as Theresa LePore
 Marcia Jean Kurtz as Carol Roberts
 Mary Bonner Baker as Kerey Carpenter
 Bob Kranz as Bob Butterworth
 Raymond Forchion as Jeff Robinson
 Steve DuMouchel as John Hardin Young
 Marc Macaulay as Robert Zoellick
 Antoni Corone as Tom Feeney
 Matt Miller as Jeb Bush
 Terry Loughlin as William Rehnquist
 Judy Clayton as Sandra Day O'Connor
 William Schallert as John Paul Stevens
 Bruce Gray as Anthony Kennedy
 Michael Bryan French as David Souter
 Howard Elfman as Stephen Breyer
 Jack Shearer as Antonin Scalia
 Benjamin Clayton as Clarence Thomas
 Bradford DeVine as Charles T. Wells
 Candice Critchfield as Judge Myriam Lehr
 Annie Cerillo as Barbara Pariente
 Brewier Welch as Harry Lee Anstead
 Derek Cecil as Jeremy Bash
 Robert Small as George J. Terwilliger III
 Patricia Getty as Margaret D. Tutwiler
 Christopher Schmidt as John E. Sweeney
 Olgia Campbell as Donna Brazile
 James Carrey as Chris Lehane
 Brent Mendenhall as George W. Bush
 Grady Couch as Al Gore
 David Lodge as Joe Lieberman
 Carole Wood as Tipper Gore
 Mark Lamoureux as Reporter
 Tom Hillmann as Brad Blakeman
 Adam LeFevre as Mark Herron

Production

Director
In April 2007, it was announced that Sydney Pollack would direct the film. By August, weeks away from the start of principal photography, Pollack withdrew from the project due to a then-undisclosed illness, and was replaced by Jay Roach. Pollack died of cancer on May 26, 2008, one day after Recount premiered on HBO.

Casting
On September 24, 2007, it was announced that Kevin Spacey would star as Ron Klain.

Filming
Recount was shot in Jacksonville and Tallahassee, Florida.

Reception

Reviews
On review aggregator website Rotten Tomatoes, the film holds an approval rating of 78%, based on 18 reviews, and an average rating of 6.4/10. On Metacritic, the film has a weighted average score of 66 out of 100, based on 25 critics, indicating "generally favorable reviews". Mark Moorman of Het Parool, gave the film a rating of four stars on a scale of five, calling Recount an "amazing and funny reconstruction".

Response to fictionalization
Some critics have made charges of bias against the film. Entertainment Weekly wrote, "Recount may not be downright blue, but it's not as purply as it wants to appear. Despite its equal time approach, Recount is an underdog story, and thus a Democrat story."  Film critic Roger Ebert disputed claims of bias in his review of the film, stating, "You might assume the movie is pro-Gore and anti-Bush, but you would not be quite right."

In an interview with CNN's Reliable Sources, director Jay Roach responded that the film, "wasn't 100 percent accurate, but it was very true to what went on. ... That's what dramatizations do: stitch together the big ideas with, sometimes, constructs that have to stand for a larger truth." Roach cited All the President's Men as an example. Jake Tapper, an ABC newscaster who was a consultant for the film also stated in response that the film is "a fictional version of what happened" and "tilts to the left because it's generally told from the point of view of the Democrats." The Washington Post further stated that Tapper noted that "while some scenes and language are manufactured, 'a lot of dialogue is not invented, a lot of dialogue is taken from my book, other books and real life.' " 

Florida Supreme Court spokesman Craig Waters agreed that the script departed from the actual statements he made on live television from the courthouse steps in the fall of 2000. "But the words spoken by the actor who played me [Alex Staggs]," Waters said, "are accurate paraphrasis of the things I actually said or of the documents released by the court at the time."

Warren Christopher, who was sent by Gore to supervise the recount, has objected to his portrayal in the film. According to the San Jose Mercury News, Christopher:  Baker agreed that the film exaggerated his rival's stance: "He's not that much of a wuss," said Matea Gold of the San Jose Mercury News.

Democratic strategist Michael Whouley has objected to the amount of swearing he does in the film, and was also uncomfortable with a scene involving a broken chair.

In contrast, Bush legal advisers James Baker and Benjamin Ginsberg have largely given the film good reviews; Baker even hosted his own screening of it, though he does refer to the film as a "Hollywood rendition" of what happened.

Awards and nominations

Gallery

References

External links
 
 
 

2008 television films
2008 films
2008 drama films
2000 United States presidential election in Florida
2000s English-language films
2000s political drama films
American films based on actual events
American political drama films
Drama films based on actual events
American drama television films
Films about the 2000 United States presidential election
Films directed by Jay Roach
Films scored by Dave Grusin
Films shot in Jacksonville, Florida
Films with screenplays by Danny Strong
HBO Films films
Political films based on actual events
Primetime Emmy Award for Outstanding Made for Television Movie winners
Television films based on actual events
2000s American films